Frutiger AG is a construction and civil engineering company with its headquarters in the Swiss city of Thun.

Along with Bilfinger SE, Implenia and Impresa Pizzarotti, Frutiger forms part of the Transco consortium responsible for the Sedrun work site of the Gotthard Base Tunnel.

At the beginning of 2008, Frutiger AG took over the business activities and 180 employees of the Marazzi construction company from Losinger Construction AG, a subdivision of Marazzi Holding, which Losinger took over in the summer of 2006. With the takeover of Kwartex Holding in October 2008, retroactive to January 2008, the Frutiger Group expanded its activities to include concrete cutting and separation, demolition and deep drilling in southern Germany and Alsace. In 2018, the Frutiger Group comprised 2,869 employees in 24 companies, 600 of whom worked at the parent company in Thun.

References

External links
 Frutiger company web site

Construction and civil engineering companies of Switzerland